The Arafura class is a class of offshore patrol vessels being built for the Royal Australian Navy (RAN). Initially proposed in the 2009 Defence White Paper and marked as procurement project SEA 1180, it was originally planned that 20 Offshore Combatant Vessels (OCV) would replace 26 vessels across four separate ship classes: the s, the s, the s, and the es. Although having a common design (which could be up to 2,000 tonnes in displacement), the ships would use a modular mission payload system to fulfill specific roles; primarily border patrol, mine warfare, and hydrographic survey. The 2013 Defence White Paper committed to the OCV project as a long-term goal, but opted in the short term for an accelerated procurement of an existing design to replace the Armidales, and life-extension refits for the other types. This resulted in the Offshore Patrol Vessel (OPV) project and the amount of vessels reduced to 12. However, this was further increased to 14 when 2 further Mine Counter Measures variants were proposed under SEA 1905.

Then-Prime Minister Malcolm Turnbull announced on 18 April 2016 that ship designers Damen, Fassmer and Lürssen had been shortlisted for the project. On 24 November 2017, the government announced that Lürssen had been selected.

Offshore combatant proposal

Planning and design

First made public in Defending Australia in the Asia Pacific Century: Force 2030, the 2009 Department of Defence white paper, the planned vessels stem from Government instructions for the RAN to rationalise patrol, mine warfare, and hydrographic survey assets into a single class of warship. It was originally planned 20 OCVs would replace 26 vessels across four separate ship classes: the s, the s, the s, and the es

Instead of being capable of performing all roles simultaneously, the ships will have a modular mission payload system like the Standard Flex system used by the Danish Navy, or the system used by the United States Navy's littoral combat ships: mission-specific equipment will be fitted to containerised modules, which can be exchanged for different modules when the ship needs to change roles. The use of containerised modules means that equipment can be upgraded without taking the ships out of service for refit, and if necessary can be fitted to requisitioned civilian vessels. The cost in developing and implementing the modular system is predicted to be offset by the savings in the areas of maintenance (having to purchase and maintain stocks to repair four different designs), personnel (having to retrain sailors when they transfer to a new ship), and administration.

It was anticipated that the new ships could have displaced anywhere up to 2,000 tonnes, although defence magazine editor Kym Bergmann predicts that this 'worst case' would require 50,000 tons of steel or aluminium to be fabricated (compared to 36,000 tons for the Attack-class submarine program), and unless multiple shipbuilders are involved, the 12- to 18-month construction time per vessel will see the last ship enter service during the late 2020s.

Instead of building all 20 vessels to the same design, the idea of hull variants optimised for different roles is also being explored: the module system will allow a ship designed for one role to be rapidly reconfigured to serve in another role, with a small but acceptable loss in capability compared to a 'native' OPV. The OPVs could be designed to carry a helicopter or an unmanned aerial vehicle to improve each ship's surveillance range, but this avenue is dependent on further study and cost-benefit analysis.

The OPV was originally planned to replace 26 vessels across four warship classes: the s, the s, the s, and the es. The new ships were to be used for offshore and littoral patrol, border protection, anti-terrorism and anti-piracy operations, mine warfare, and hydrographic survey. It was plausible that the OPVs will operate in support of the  ships; amphibious operations would benefit from the survey and mine warfare capabilities of the ships.

Another major change, reportedly being examined by the DSR (Australia’s Defence Strategic Review), is the possibility of either up-arming or divesting the service’s new Arafura-class OPVs, before NUSHIP Arafura has even conducted sea trials. The concern is that the OPVs are not able to contribute to any high-end scenarios, as they lack so much as a large calibre gun. One possibility, being examined, is outfitting the vessels with between four and six Kongsberg Naval Strike Missiles, which the RAN is already procuring.
Another approach, which has gained some traction, is the possibility of divesting the fleet to other government agencies (such as the Australian Border Force) and international partners (such as Papua New Guinea), and instead procuring a fleet of missile-armed corvettes.

International co-operation
The Royal Navy has begun plans for a similar vessel under the Future Surface Combatant program, designated the Future Mine Countermeasures/Hydrographic/Patrol Vessel (FMHPV). Although the nations will share their analyses, a common design or shared construction program is unlikely, as the two nations have different needs and replacement schedules. The RAN is also observing the development of the United States Navy Littoral Combat Ships, to take advantage of lessons learned during the program.

Proposed designs
While designing the  trimarans for the Littoral Combat Ship program, Australian-owned shipbuilder Austal also prepared a scaled-down version that could serve as the basis for the Australian OPV. The Austal Multi Role Vessel (MRV 80) would have an overall length of 80 metres, a top speed of 26 knots, carry an NH-90 or similar helicopter, and have 500 square metres for mission equipment or cargo.

In 2012, American shipbuilder Huntington Ingalls Industries proposed a variant of the Legend-class National Security Cutter, a ship built for the United States Coast Guard.

Offshore Patrol Vessel program
Although the 2013 White Paper committed to the OCV as a long-term plan, it announced that an interim patrol boat class based on an existing design would be acquired as a short-term replacement for the Armidales, while the Palumas and Huons would undergo life-extension upgrades. The 20 vessels originally planned to be built was reduced was later reduced to 12 following the change in their planned role. The project received the procurement designation SEA 1180.

Prime Minister Malcolm Turnbull announced on 18 April 2016 that ship designers Damen, Fassmer and Lürssen had been shortlisted for the project. On 24 November 2017, the government announced that Lürssen had been selected.

In October 2017, the Australian government announced that the vessels would use an Australian-designed SAAB tactical combat management system.

Under SEA 1905 a further two ships are to be built by Civmec for the mine countermeasures role. A third vessel may be procured under SEA 2400 to fulfill the survey although this is unlikely. This was expanded in the 2020 Defence Strategic Update and 2020 Force Structure Plan released on 30 June 2020 for up to 8 vessels optimised for mine countermeasures and hydrographic survey roles potentially based on the Arafura design possibly bringing the total number of vessels back up to the original 20.

Design
The Arafura-class is based on the Lürssen-designed Darussalam-class, operated by the Royal Brunei Navy. Each vessel has a gross displacement of 1,640 tonnes, and measures 80 metres long, with a beam of 13 metres and a draft of 4 metres. Propulsion power is from two MTU 16V diesel engines rated at 4440kw each, which drive variable pitch propellers and give a top speed of 22 knots, and shipboard electrical power is generated by MAN diesel engines. The standard crew complement is 40 sailors, though up to 20 more can be berthed if required. The ships will be deployed with empty space available to install container-mounted systems such as aircraft support and sensors; if fully utilized, the gross displacement could increase to 1,800 tonnes.

Shipboard armament was originally intended to be a single 40 mm gun and two 12.7 mm guns. The 40 mm gun was cancelled in 2021 due to a combination of technical problems and a re-assessment of the threats the ships would face. The ships will instead be armed with a Typhoon Weapon Station on an interim basis until a replacement weapon is identified and then acquired.

Each vessel carries two 8.5 metre rigid inflatable boats and a single 10 metre boat, which are intended as the primary means of deploying offensive force in the ships' border patrol role.  A single unmanned aerial vehicle is carried and deployed from an open utility deck. Two separate electro-optic targeting systems and three radars are installed and managed by the Saab 9LV system.  In order to allow the ships to operate in conjunction with allied international forces, each ship is equipped with a unique electronic identifier transponder that allows for communication via the Link 16 network.

Construction
The first two vessels will be built by ASC Shipbuilding in Adelaide, South Australia before production is transferred to the shipyard of Forgacs Marine & Defence, a subsidiary of Civmec, in Henderson, Western Australia.

Construction of the first ship began on 15 November 2018. On that day, it was also announced that the vessel would be named HMAS Arafura, and the class the Arafura-class patrol vessels.

On 9 April 2020 the second ship in the class, HMAS Eyre, was laid down at ASC's shipyard. The names of the following four ships were also announced at this time: HMA Ships Pilbara, Gippsland, Illawarra and Carpentaria.

The first three ships amongst the then new names, HMAS Pilbara, HMAS Gippsland and HMAS Illawarra were laid down at the shipyard of Civmec in Henderson on 11 September 2020, 30 July 2021 and 27 September 2022, respectively.

Criticism 
With the cancellation of the main gun and the lack of any other major weaponry, the class has been criticised for being unable to operate in medium to high-end warfighting and resulting in calls to either up-arm the class or transfer the ships to the Australian Border Force Marine Unit in favour on a fleet of corvettes. The class has also faced criticism for schedule delays and being over budget.

Ships
Dates in Italics indicate estimates

Citations

References

External links
 Arafura Class OPV on Royal Australian Navy website

Patrol vessels of the Royal Australian Navy
Proposed ships